Country View is a suburb of Midrand, South Africa. It is located in Region A of the City of Johannesburg Metropolitan Municipality.

Another Country View suburb is located in Benoni, Gauteng.

References

Johannesburg Region A